Sergio Minero Pineda (born 1974) is a Costa Rican chess player. He was awarded the title International Master by FIDE in 1996.

Career
He has represented Costa Rica at a number of Chess Olympiads, including 1988 (scoring 6/11 on board 4), 1990 (8.5/13 on board 3), 2002 (7/11 on board 2), 2014 (4/9 on board 3) and 2016 (6/10 on board 1).

He has won the Costa Rican Chess Championship five times; in 1992, 1999, 2004, 2015 and 2020.

He qualified for the Chess World Cup 2021, where he was defeated 2-0 by Alan Pichot in the first round.

References

External links

Sergio Minero Pineda games at 365Chess.com 

1974 births
Living people
Costa Rican chess players
Chess Olympiad competitors